In the Fall of 2012, American rock band Imagine Dragons toured North America.

Setlist

North America
 Rocks
 Hear Me
 Amsterdam
 Bleeding Out
 Radioactive
 Tiptoe
 Demons
 On Top of The World (or 30 Lives)
 Cha Ching (Til We Grow Older)
 Round and Round (or Every Night)
 Underdog 
 It's Time
 Nothing Left To Say

In Columbus, Indianapolis, San Diego, Saint Louis, Columbia, Ybor City, Atlanta, Los Angelis, Tucson, Austin, and Albuquerque, an abbreviated set list was performed:
 Rocks
 Hear Me 
 Radioactive
 Tiptoe
 Demons
 On Top of the World
 It's Time
 Nothing Left to Say

At the piazza at Schmidt's in Philadelphia:
 Rocks
 Hear Me
 Amsterdam
 Demons
 Radioactive
 On Top of the World
 Tiptoe
 It's Time
 Nothing Left to Say

At the observatory in Santa Ana
 Rocks
 Radioactive 
 Demons
 On Top of the World
 It's Time
 Nothing Left to Say

Amazon Headquarters in Seattle:
 It's Time
 Radioactive
 Every Night 
 Destination

Uptown Theatre in Kansas City:
 Radioactive
 On Top of the World
 Nothing Left to Say

House of Blues, Lake Beuna Vista:
 Rocks
 Radioactive
 On Top of the World
 It's Time

House of Blues, Dallas
 Rocks
 Radioactive
 Demons
 It's Time
 Nothing Left to Say

All Setlists per setlist.fm

Tour dates

References

Imagine Dragons concert tours
2012 concert tours